Marcel Sobottka (born 25 April 1994) is a German professional footballer who plays as a defender or defensive midfielder for Fortuna Düsseldorf in the .

Club career
Sobottka joined Fortuna Düsseldorf in 2015 from Schalke 04. He made his 2. Bundesliga debut on 22 August 2015 against SC Freiburg in a 2–1 home defeat replacing Julian Koch after 45 minutes.

In June 2017, he agreed to new five-year contract until 2022.

International career
Sobottka played one cap for the Germany U20 national team in a friendly against the Poland U20.

References

External links
 
 

1994 births
Living people
Sportspeople from Gelsenkirchen
German footballers
Footballers from North Rhine-Westphalia
Association football defenders
Association football midfielders
Germany youth international footballers
Bundesliga players
2. Bundesliga players
FC Schalke 04 II players
Fortuna Düsseldorf players
Fortuna Düsseldorf II players